Parastichtis is a genus of moths of the family Noctuidae.

Species
 Parastichtis suspecta (Hübner, [1817]) (syn: Parastichtis discivaria (Walker, 1856))

References
Natural History Museum Lepidoptera genus database
Parastichtis at funet

Cuculliinae